Anna Marcoulli (born 1974) is a Cypriot Judge of the General Court (European Union).

She was educated at the University of East Anglia  (LLB, 1995) and the University of Bristol (LLM, 1996).

References

1974 births
Living people
Alumni of the University of East Anglia
Alumni of the University of Bristol
General Court (European Union) judges
21st-century Cypriot judges
Women judges
Cypriot  judges of international courts and tribunals
Cypriot officials of the European Union